In organic chemistry, the acetoxy group (abbr. AcO or OAc; IUPAC name: acetyloxy), is a functional group with the formula  and the structure . As the -oxy suffix implies, it differs from the acetyl group by the presence of an additional oxygen atom. The name acetoxy is the short form of acetyl-oxy.

Functionality
An acetoxy group may be used as a protection for an alcohol functionality in a synthetic route although the protecting group itself is called an acetyl group.

Alcohol protection
There are several options of introducing an acetoxy functionality in a molecule from an alcohol (in effect protecting the alcohol by acetylation):
 Acetyl halide, such as acetyl chloride in the presence of a base like triethylamine
 Activated ester form of acetic acid, such as a N-hydroxysuccinimide ester, although this is not advisable due to higher costs and difficulties.
 Acetic anhydride in the presence of base with a catalyst such as pyridine with a bit of DMAP added.

An alcohol is not a particularly strong nucleophile and, when present, more powerful nucleophiles like amines will react with the above-mentioned reagents in preference to the alcohol.

Alcohol deprotection
For deprotection (regeneration of the alcohol)
 Aqueous base (pH >9)
 Aqueous acid (pH <2), may have to be heated
 Anhydrous base such as sodium methoxide in methanol. Very useful when a methyl ester of a carboxylic acid is also present in the molecule, as it will not hydrolyze it like an aqueous base would. (Same also holds with an ethoxide in ethanol with ethyl esters)

See also
 Acetyl group
 Acetylation

References

Functional groups